is a former Japanese football player.

Club statistics

References

External links
j-league

1991 births
Living people
Association football people from Aichi Prefecture
Japanese footballers
J1 League players
Kawasaki Frontale players
Association football forwards